This is the discography of Salt-n-Pepa, an American hip hop trio.

Albums

Studio albums

Compilation albums

Singles

As lead artist

As featured performer

Music videos

References

Notes

Citations

Hip hop discographies
Discographies of American artists